An election to the Neath Rural District Council in Wales was held in March 1934. It was preceded by the 1931 election  and was followed by the 1937 election.

Overview of the results
Labour won control of the authority for the first time, winning sixteen setas as opposed to thirteen for the Independents.

Boundary changes
Ystradfellte ward was removed to Breconshire, reducing the number of councillors from 31 to 29. This rural ward had long been represented by Independent councillors who were usually returned unopposed.

Candidates
All seats were contested apart from Tonmawr, where the longest serving Labour member, William Jones, was returned unopposed, and Clyne, which was also taken without opposition by Labour. Most of the other seats saw Labour candidates face Independent nominees, with a small number of Independent Labour and Communist candidates.

Outcome
Having won a majority for the first time, Labour councillors moved swiftly to imposed their authority. Independent councillors had for the past six years denied Labour any significant roles within the council, so this was taken as a reason for Labour to reverse this position. William Jones, Tonmawr, the senior Labour councillor on the authority, who had been proposed many times as chairman, without success, was elected by fifteen votes to thirteen, with John james of Crynant elected vice-chairman by a similar margin.

Ward Results

Baglan Higher (one seat)

Blaengwrach (one seats)

Blaenrhonddan (three seats)

Clyne (one seats)

Coedffranc (five seats)

Dyffryn Clydach (two seats)

Dulais Higher, Crynant Ward (one seat)

Dulais Higher, Onllwyn Ward (one seat)

Dulais Higher, Seven Sisters Ward (two seats)

Dulais Lower (one seat)

Michaelstone Higher (one seat)

Neath Higher (three seats)

Neath Lower (one seat)

Resolven, Cwmgwrach Ward (one seat)

Resolven, Resolven Ward (two seats)

Resolven, Rhigos Ward (two seats)

Resolven, Tonna Ward (one seat)

References

1934 Welsh local elections